The News with Shepard Smith was an American news television program hosted by Shepard Smith that aired on CNBC. The program, which premiered on September 30, 2020, was a general interest news show that aired at 7 PM ET. 

The show was the first hosted by Smith since his departure from Fox News in 2019. On November 3, 2022, CNBC canceled the program after two years, and Smith announced his departure from the network.

The News was the first nightly newscast to air on CNBC since May 2004.

Content
Smith has stated that the program is meant to be "fact-based" and will not include analysis or opinion. Smith has stated of the show: "We’re going to have journalists, reporters, sound and video. We’re going to have newsmakers and experts ... but no pundits."

Episodes
The first episode of the show drew 373,000 viewers, "behind major cable news networks but a boost for CNBC for the time period."

The first episodes of the show were being shot in a temporary studio. This studio is a boxed off area in Studio A at CNBC Global Headquarters. This studio was used until construction on a dedicated set was completed. The new set debuted on October 28, 2020.

See also
 List of programs broadcast by CNBC
 List of 2020 American television debuts
 NewsNation Prime (another fact-based newscast, but aired 7 nights a week, on NewsNation)

References

External links
Official website

2020s American television news shows
2020 American television series debuts
2022 American television series endings
CNBC original programming
English-language television shows